Stark Park is a city park located on the north side of Manchester, New Hampshire.  It is a  parcel of land between River Road and the Merrimack River, which was once part of the larger farm property of American Revolutionary War hero John Stark. It was listed on the U.S. National Register of Historic Places in 2006, and the New Hampshire State Register of Historic Places in 2010.

History and description
The centerpieces of the park are the Stark Burial Ground, where Stark and some of his family are interred, and the 1948 bronze equestrian statue of Stark made by sculptor Richard Henry Recchia.  The park was formally opened in 1893, making it one of the city's oldest parks (only Derryfield Park is older).  It was originally designed as a typical Victorian-era park, with winding lanes, and a mix of woodlands, lawns, and gardens.  A colonnade of elm trees originally lined the three land borders of the park, but were lost to Dutch Elm disease in the 20th century.  Some of its paths and vistas have also become overgrown since the park was established.

John Stark was buried here after his death in 1822, and the family erected a memorial obelisk in 1829. Stark's great-grandchildren deeded a  area surrounding the family cemetery to the city in 1876. Public interest for a larger park memorializing Stark took place in the 1880s, and the family gave another  to the city in 1891. The initial design of the park was made by Morton & Quimby, landscape architects from Boston, Massachusetts, and it was formally dedicated on June 17, 1893.

See also
Gen. John Stark House
National Register of Historic Places listings in Hillsborough County, New Hampshire
New Hampshire Historical Marker No. 225: Stark Park

References

External links

Friends of Stark Park

Protected areas established in 1892
Manchester, New Hampshire
1892 establishments in New Hampshire
Protected areas of Hillsborough County, New Hampshire
Tourist attractions in Manchester, New Hampshire
Parks on the National Register of Historic Places in New Hampshire
National Register of Historic Places in Hillsborough County, New Hampshire
New Hampshire State Register of Historic Places